Lepista aposema is a moth of the subfamily Arctiinae. It was described by Lars Kühne in 2010. It is found in Mozambique, South Africa, Eswatini and Zimbabwe.

References

Lithosiini
Moths described in 2010
Moths of Sub-Saharan Africa
Lepidoptera of Southern Africa